Public art of the Washington State Ferries system includes artwork on all or nearly all of the state's 23 ferries, available for viewing by millions of passengers annually. In addition to the public art installed aboard vessels, new terminal projects are required to set aside funds for artwork under Washington state law; a Kickstarter campaign funded art at the Banbridge Island terminal; and in one case, the hull of a former state ferry –  – is in the process of being repurposed as public art.

Seattle Arts Commission owns the Joshua Green Fountain, a bronze work by George Tsutakawa that was on display outside the main Colman Dock ferry terminal.

The agency has also displayed artwork by Washington youth on the covers of one million of its winter 2016 and spring 2017 sailing schedules.

References

Sources

Washington State Ferries
Washington State Ferries